See How They Run is a 1964 American made-for-television drama film broadcast on NBC. It is generally regarded as the first made-for-television film.

Plot
Three orphans head for the US, unknowingly carrying important evidence pointing to the existence of a corrupt international cartel that has just murdered their father. The cartel is desperate to retrieve the evidence.

Cast
John Forsythe as Martin Young
Senta Berger as Orlando Miller
Jane Wyatt as Augusta Flanders
Pamela Franklin as Tirza Green
Franchot Tone as Baron Frood
Leslie Nielsen as Elliott Green
George Kennedy as Rudy
Jami Fields as Maggie Green
Jackie Jones as Jamsey Green
Harlan Warde as Manley

References

External links 
 
 

1964 television films
1964 films
1964 drama films
1960s chase films
Films directed by David Lowell Rich
NBC network original films
Films scored by Lalo Schifrin
American drama television films
1960s English-language films
1960s American films